Rexha is a surname of Albanian origin.

Notable people with this name include:

Bebe Rexha (born 1989), American singer and songwriter
Ervin Rexha (born 1991), Albanian footballer
Fitnete Rexha (1933–2003), Albanian folk singer

See also
Kënga e Rexhës, a ballet whose title means Rexha's song

Surnames
Albanian-language surnames